James Naughton (born December 6, 1945) is an American actor and director. He is best known as Michael Bower on Who's the Boss? (1984-1992) and was also notable for his earlier role as the astronaut Pete Burke in the 1974 single-season television adaptation of Planet of the Apes.

Early life
Naughton was born in Middletown, Connecticut, the son of Rosemary (née Walsh) and Joseph Naughton, both of whom were teachers. He is the elder brother of actor David Naughton. He graduated from Conard High School.  Jim began singing during his years at Conard High School "with the high school band and at parties."

Career
Naughton graduated from Brown University and Yale School of Drama. His acting career began when he appeared in a series of Broadway dramas and musicals. He has since become an accomplished actor in both starring and supporting film and television roles.

His largest fame and first love has been the legitimate theater. He won the Theatre World Award for his performance in Long Day's Journey into Night in 1971. He starred with Geneviève Bujold in Antigone, later made into a film in 1974.  He starred in I Love My Wife in 1977 and in Whose Life is it Anyway? in 1980. He won his first Tony Award for Best Actor in a Musical in 1990 for City of Angels. In 1997, he won a second Tony Award with his portrayal of lawyer Billy Flynn in the musical Chicago. He played the role of Willy Brandt in Democracy on its U.S. première in 2004. His films include The Paper Chase and The First Wives Club. In 2006, he appeared in the movie The Devil Wears Prada.  In 2006, he played Fuzzy Sedgwick in Factory Girl.

Television and commercials
On television, he starred in Faraday & Company with Dan Dailey and Sharon Gless (1973–1974). He also starred with Ron Harper in the 1974 television series Planet of the Apes, a spin-off of the original film. He starred in Making the Grade and Trauma Center in the early 1980s. He starred in the short-lived series Raising Miranda in 1988. From 1991 to 1993 he played Lt. Patrick Monahan on the series Brooklyn Bridge. He co-starred with Bill Cosby in The Cosby Mysteries in 1995. He appeared with Gless 20 years later, this time as her husband in Cagney and Lacey: The Return (1993) and Cagney and Lacey: Together Again (1995). He appeared on Damages with Glenn Close. Naughton had a recurring role on Gossip Girl as William van der Bilt, grandfather of main character Nate Archibald.

He has appeared in television commercials promoting the drugs Cialis, Nexium and Nasalcrom. Naughton has also been the official voice of Audi in the U.S. since 2007, heard in its national TV and radio spots. He is also a frequent narrator on television's Nature series.

Director
He has directed several plays in New York City, including the 2002 revival of Thornton Wilder's Our Town, starring his friend Paul Newman, filmed for cable TV in 2003. He appears in cabarets in New York City, including Manhattan Theatre Club and Caroline's Comedy Club.

Personal life
His family is Irish American. He and his first wife, Pam Parsons, have two actor children: Keira and Greg. Greg is married to actress Kelli O'Hara. Pam died from pancreatic cancer in 2013.

Stage productions
Long Day's Journey into Night (1971)
Antigone (1972)
I Love My Wife (1979)
Whose Life is it Anyway? (1980)
City of Angels (1990) (Tony Award for Best Performance by a Leading Actor in a Musical)
Four Baboons Adoring the Sun (1992)
Chicago (1996) (Tony Award for Best Performance by a Leading Actor in a Musical)
The Price (director) (1999)
Our Town (2003)
Prymate (2004)
Democracy (2004)

Filmography
The Paper Chase (1973) - Kevin Brooks
Planet of the Apes (1974) - Major Peter J. Burke (TV series)
Second Wind (1976) - Roger
Diary of the Dead (1980) - George
The Bunker (1981) - James P. O'Donnell
A Stranger Is Watching (1982) - Steve Peterson
My Body, My Child (1982) - Dr. Dan Berensen
Who's the Boss? (1984-1992) - recurring role of Michael Bower (ex-husband of Angela Bower played by Judith Light)
Cat's Eye (1985) - Hugh (segment "The General")
The Glass Menagerie (1987) - The Gentleman Caller (James Delaney "Jim" O'Connor)
The Good Mother (1988) - Brian
Raising Miranda (1988) - Donald Marshak
Brooklyn Bridge (1991-1993) recurring role of Lt. Patrick Monahan.
Designing Women (1992) - Phillip Russell Stuart (Episode: Screaming Passage)
The Birds II: Land's End - (1994) - Frank
First Kid (1996) - President Davenport
The First Wives Club (1996) - Gilbert Griffin
The Proprietor (1996) - New York - Texans
Law & Order (1996) - Barry Taggert (episode "Girlfriends")
Oxygen (1999) - Clark Hannon
Ally McBeal (1999–2000) - George McBeal
Labor Pains (2000) - Actor
The Truth About Jane (2000) - Robert
Law & Order: Criminal Intent (2002) - Dr. Roger Buckman (episode "Seizure")
Fascination (2004) - Patrick Doherty
The Devil Wears Prada (2006) - Stephen
Factory Girl (2006) - Fuzzy Sedgwick
Suburban Girl (2007) - Robert Eisenberg
Gossip Girl (2009) - William Vanderbilt
Warehouse 13 (2009)
Hostages (2013) - President Paul Kincaid
Turks & Caicos (2014)
The Blacklist (2015) - Hayworth
The Affair (2015) - Rodney Callahan
Cathedral (2018) - Robert

References

External links

1945 births
20th-century American male actors
21st-century American male actors
American male film actors
American male musical theatre actors
American male television actors
American television directors
American theatre directors
Brown University alumni
Drama Desk Award winners
Living people
Male actors from Connecticut
People from Middletown, Connecticut
People from West Hartford, Connecticut
Tony Award winners
Yale School of Drama alumni